The 1938–39 Taça de Portugal was the first season of the Taça de Portugal (English: Portuguese Cup), the premier Portuguese football knockout competition, organized by the Portuguese Football Federation (FPF). The final was played on 26 June 1939 between Académica de Coimbra and Sport Lisboa e Benfica.

The Taça de Portugal replaced the previous knockout competition, the Campeonato de Portugal (Championship of Portugal), which defined the Portuguese champion.

Participating Teams

Primeira Divisão 
(8 Teams)
Associação Académica de Coimbra – Organismo Autónomo de Futebol
Académico Futebol Clube "do Porto"
Futebol Clube Barreirense
Clube de Futebol Os Belenenses
Sport Lisboa e Benfica
Casa Pia Atlético Clube
Futebol Clube do Porto
Sporting Clube de Portugal

Segunda Divisão 
(6 Teams)
Carcavelinhos Football Club
Sporting Clube Farense
Luso Sport Clube "Beja"
Sporting Clube da Covilhã
Sport Clube Vila Real
Vitória Sport Clube "de Guimarães"

Madeira Championship 
(1 Team)
Clube Desportivo Nacional "da Madeira"

Bracket

First round
In this round entered the teams from Primeira Divisão (1st level) and Segunda Divisão (2nd level).

Results

|}

Quarterfinals
In this round entered the winner from Madeira Championship and the winners of the previous round.

Results

|}

Semifinals

Results

|}

Final

References

External links
Official webpage 
1938–39 Taça de Portugal at zerozero.pt 

1938-39
Port
1938–39 in Portuguese football